Kathy Troccoli is the self-titled fifth full-length album from singer-songwriter Kathy Troccoli. It was released by Reunion Records in 1994. The lead single was Diane Warren's "Tell Me Where It Hurts". The songs "My Life Is In Your Hands" and "Mission of Love" were top ten Christian radio hits. In 1995, Troccoli was nominated for Female Vocalist of the Year and for Song of the Year for the track "My Life Is in Your Hands", which she co-wrote with Bill Montvilo, at the 25th GMA Dove Awards. The album peaked at number ten on the Billboard Top Christian Albums chart.

Track listing
"Just You" (Troccoli, Bill Montvilo) - 4:33
"Tell Me Where It Hurts" (Diane Warren) - 4:03
"If I'm Not in Love" (Dawn Thomas) - 3:47
"I'll Be There (For You)" (Klarmann/Weber, Troccoli) - 4:36
"All of My Life" (Omartian, Troccoli) - 4:30
"Takin' a Chance" (Whitney Houston, Keith Thomas, BeBe Winans) - 3:38
"Mission of Love" (Christian James, George McFarlane, Ray St. John, Troccoli) - 4:35
"Never My Love" (Addrisi Brothers) - 4:12
"Fallin'" (Omartian, Troccoli) - 4:11
"My Life Is in Your Hands" (Montvilo, Troccoli) - 4:35

Personnel 

 Kathy Troccoli – lead vocals
 Brad Cole – keyboards and arrangements (1, 8)
 Keith Thomas – synthesizers, bass programming, drums and percussion (2)
 Robbie Buchanan – keyboards (3)
 Michael Omartian – keyboards, programming and arrangements (4, 5, 7, 9, 10), backing vocals (4, 7, 9)
 Rich Tancredi – keyboards and arrangements (6)
 Freddie Fox – guitars (1)
 Dann Huff – guitars (2, 4, 7)
 Bob Mann – guitars (3, 8)
 Jerry McPherson – guitars (4, 9, 10)
 Vail Johnson – bass guitar (3)
 Mark Hammond – drums and percussion (2)
 Matt Noble – drums and percussion (2)
 John Robinson – drums (3)
 Chester Thompson – drums (5, 10)
 Joey Franco – drums (6)
 Richie Jones – drums (6)
 Andy Snitzer – saxophone (6)
 Warren Hill – soprano saxophone (8)
 Mark Douthit – saxophone (9)
 Orion Crawford – orchestration (3)
 The Nashville String Machine – orchestra (3, 5, 10)
 Carl Gorodetzky – concertmaster (3, 5, 10)
 Ric Wake – arrangements (6)
 Peter Bunetta – arrangements (8)
 Rick Chudacoff – arrangements (8)
 Ellis Hall – backing vocals (1, 8)
 Maxayn Lewis – backing vocals (1, 8)
 Syreeta Wright – backing vocals (1, 8)
 Ada Dyer – backing vocals (2)
 Judson Spence – backing vocals (2)
 Audrey Wheeler – backing vocals (2)
 Ashley Cleveland – backing vocals (4, 7, 9)
 Donna McElroy – backing vocals (4, 7, 9)
 Michael Mellett – backing vocals (4, 7, 9)
 Terri Jones – backing vocals (6)
 Earl Robinson – backing vocals (6)
 Eddie Stockley – backing vocals (6)

Production

 Michael Blanton – executive producer, A&R
 Joe Galante – executive producer
 Peter Bunetta – producer (1, 3, 8)
 Rick Chudacoff – producer (1, 3, 8)
 Keith Thomas – producer (2)
 Michael Omartian – producer (4, 5, 7, 9, 10)
 Ric Wake – producer (6)
 Leon Johnson – engineer (1, 8)
 Bill Whittington – engineer (2), mixing (2)
 Daren Klein – engineer (3)
 Terry Christian – engineer (4, 5, 7, 9, 10)
 Bob Cadway – engineer (6)
 Mick Guzauski – mixing (1, 3, 4, 5, 7–10)
 Rick Kerr – mixing (6)
 Eric Rudd – additional engineer (1, 3, 8)
 James Brick – additional engineer (2), assistant engineer (3)
 Jim Dineen – additional engineer (4, 5, 7, 9, 10)
 Tom Yezzi – additional engineer (6)
 Terry Bates – assistant engineer (1, 3, 8)
 Eric Stitt Greedy – assistant engineer (1, 3, 8)
 Andy Udoff – assistant engineer (1, 8)
 Greg Parker – assistant engineer (2)
 Scott Link – assistant engineer (4, 5, 7, 9, 10)
 Doug McGuirk – assistant engineer (6)
 David Shackney – assistant engineer (6)
 Tejas Recorders, Franklin, Tennessee – recording studio
 The Bennett House, Franklin, Tennessee – recording studio, mixing studio
 Javelina Studio, Nashville, Tennessee – recording studio
 Manzanita, Arrington, Tennessee – recording studio
 Rumbo Recorders, Los Angeles, California – recording studio
 Cornerstone Studios, Chatsworth, California – recording studio, mixing studio
 Cove City Sound Studios, Long Island, New York – recording studio, mixing studio
 The Dream Factory, New York City – recording studio
 Secret Sound, New York City – mixing studio
 Andora Studios, Los Angeles, California – mixing studio
 Todd Moore – production coordinator (2, 3)
 Susan Martinez – production coordinator (4, 5, 7, 9, 10)

Charts

Radio singles

References 

1994 albums
Kathy Troccoli albums
Albums produced by Michael Omartian
Albums produced by Ric Wake
Reunion Records albums
RCA Records albums